SS Java was a British and French ocean liner built in 1865 at Glasgow by J. G. Thompson & Co. It served for the Cunard Line. One passenger, the musician Philo Adams Otis, noted:

There were only four good ships of the Cunard Company in the Liverpool service in 1873:  Russia, Scotia, Cuba, and Java.  The two former were side-wheelers and were largely advertised as "carrying no steerage passengers".  Among old travellers the two latter ships were respectively called the "rolling Cuba" and the "jumping Java," from certain peculiarities manifested by these ships in heavy weather, not especially conducive to the comfort of the passengers.

In 1877, the ship was re-engined with compound engines by Fawcett, Preston & Co., Liverpool, and chartered to Warren Line, until it had been sold to Red Star Line one year later and renamed to SS Zeeland.

In 1889, it was sold to a French company and renamed the Electrique. In 1892 it was sold again to J. Herron & Co of Liverpool and again renamed the Lord Spencer. During an 1895 voyage from San Francisco to New York it went missing. One account claimed it collided with the Prince Oscar'' on 13 July and sunk shortly thereafter.

References 

Ocean liners of the United Kingdom
Ships of the Cunard Line
Passenger ships of the United Kingdom
Passenger ships of France
1865 ships
Ships built on the River Clyde
1865 in Scotland
Maritime incidents in 1895
1895 in the United States
Shipwrecks
Missing ships
Ships lost with all hands